SCDG may refer to:

 Sacred City Derby Girls, from Sacramento, California
 Salt City Derby Girls, from Salt Lake City, Utah